Epoxomicin is a naturally occurring selective proteasome inhibitor with anti-inflammatory activity. It was originally discovered in 1992.  Injected, it can induce Parkinson's-like symptoms in rats.

Derivatives of epoxomicin include carfilzomib.

References

Further reading

 
 
 
 
 

Epoxides
Proteasome inhibitors